Ali Derhemi (1850-?) was an Albanian politician and mayor of Tirana from 1923 through 1924.

References

Year of birth missing
Year of death missing
Mayors of Tirana